Tambura County (spelled also as Tombura County) is an administrative area in Western Equatoria (before 22 February 2020 Tambura State), South Sudan.

References

Western Equatoria
Counties of South Sudan